I'm Tired of Driving is an album by saxophonist/pianist Eddie Harris recorded in 1978 and released on the RCA label.

Reception

Richard S. Ginell of AllMusic called it a "somewhat tepid brew of mostly R&B/slanted pop/jazz music with a whiff of disco now and then, utilizing Harris' array of straight and electronically-altered vocals, lots of acoustic tenor sax, and some piano" and said "Although EH's personal sax sound is always recognizable, and he is more crisply recorded than on any of his Atlantic records, the LP's anonymous, pre-packaged '70s feeling drains much of Harris' personality right out of the studio".

Track listing
All compositions by Eddie Harris except where noted.
 "Two Times Two Equals Love" (Harris, Y. Harris) – 5:55
 "You Are the One" (Harris, L. Harris) – 3:57
 "Songbird" (Dave Wolfert, Steve Nelson) – 4:05
 "I'm Tired of Driving" (Harris, S. Harris) – 4:50
 "The Loneliest Monk" – 3:58
 "Theme for the Foxy Ladies" (Richard Evans) – 3:39
 "You Stole My Heart" (Harris, S., L, & Y. Harris) – 3:18
 "There Was a Time" – 5:02
 "What's Wrong with The World Today" – 4:35

Personnel
Eddie Harris – varitone, tenor saxophone, piano
Danny Leake- guitar
Denzil Miller – keyboards
Larry Ball – bass
Steve Cobb, Morris Jennings (track 6) – drums
Russell Iverson – trumpet
Robert Lewis – cornet
Kenneth Brass – flugelhorn
John Avant, Morris Ellis – trombone
John William Haynor – bass trombone 
Murray Watson, Steele Seals – saxophones
S. A. Bobrov, Joel Smirnoff, Arnold Roth, Frank Borgognone, Roger Moulton, E. Zlatoff-Mirsky, Elliot Golub, George Palermo – violin
Martin Abrams, Arnold Sklar – viola
Karl B. Fruh, Kenneth Slowik – cello
Cinnamon: Bernadene Davis, Francine Smith, Jo Ann Brown-El – backing vocals

References

Eddie Harris albums
1978 albums
RCA Records albums